The Battle of Toksun occurred in July 1933 when Khoja Niyas Hajji, a Uighur leader, defected with his forces to the newly enthroned government of Sheng Shicai. Khoja Niyas Hajji marched with his troops across Dawan Ch'eng and occupied Toksun, where the New 36th Division forces of General Ma Shih-ming achieved victory over Niyas Hajji's forces.

References

Conflicts in 1933
1933 in China
East Turkestan independence movement
Xinjiang Wars